Herbert H. Smith was a member of the Wisconsin State Assembly and the Wisconsin State Senate.

Biography
Smith was born on July 18, 1898 in Kingston, Ontario. He attended South Division High School in Milwaukee, Wisconsin before graduating from the University of Wisconsin Law School in 1922.

Career
Smith was elected to the Assembly in 1924. Later, he represented the 7th district of the Senate from 1927 to 1930. He was a Republican.

References

1898 births
Year of death missing
Canadian emigrants to the United States
Republican Party members of the Wisconsin State Assembly
Politicians from Milwaukee
University of Wisconsin Law School alumni
Republican Party Wisconsin state senators
South Division High School alumni